Sonora Township is one of twenty-four townships in Hancock County, Illinois, USA.  As of the 2010 census, its population was 494 and it contained 234 housing units.

Geography

Cities, towns, villages
 Nauvoo (east edge)

Unincorporated towns
 Powellton at 
(This list is based on USGS data and may include former settlements.)

Extinct towns
 Sonora at 
(These towns are listed as "historical" by the USGS.)

Cemeteries
The township contains these seven cemeteries: Nauvoo City, Nauvoo Two, Oak Grove, Pioneer Saints, Saints Peter and Paul, Sterns and Thornber.

Major highways
  Illinois Route 96

Airports and landing strips
 Cedar Ridge Airport
 Sinele Strip

Landmarks
 Mormon Cemetery
 Oak Grove Cemetery
 Sterne Cemetery

Demographics

School districts
 Hamilton Community Consolidated School District 328
 Nauvoo-Colusa Community Unit School District 325

Political districts
 Illinois's 18th congressional district
 State House District 94
 State Senate District 47

References
 United States Census Bureau 2008 TIGER/Line Shapefiles
 
 United States National Atlas

External links
 City-Data.com
 Illinois State Archives
 Township Officials of Illinois

Townships in Hancock County, Illinois
1849 establishments in Illinois
Townships in Illinois